Dániel Böde (born 24 October 1986) is a Hungarian professional footballer who plays for Paksi FC as a forward.

Club career

Paks
Böde was born in Szekszárd, Tolna County and started to play for the local neighbouring club Paksi SE.
On 16 September 2006, Böde played his first Hungarian League match against Diósgyőri VTK which was won by his club by 2–1.

In 2011 Böde played a major role in Paks's international success in the 2011–12 Europa League season. Böde played his first international match in Andorra where Paks beat UE Santa Coloma 1–0. The only goal of the match came in the 14th minute when Gábor Vayer scored. At home Paks debuted with a four-goal win in Videoton FC's stadium, the Sóstói Stadion. József Magasföldi scored twice, one in each half. Dániel Böde and Norbert Heffler also contributed to the final result.

In the second round Böde's Paks faced the Norwegian Tromsø IL at home in front of 1,800 spectators, again in the Sóstói Stadion, in Székesfehérvár. The first goal of the match was scored by Magnus Andersen, with an equaliser from Hungarian Gábor Vayer. The match finished 1–1. In the second leg in Norway at the Alfheim Stadion Tamás Kiss scored to give Paks the lead in the 59th minute. Two more goals were scored by Dániel Böde and again Kiss on the night gave Paks a 4–1 aggregate win over Tromsø.

In the third round Paks were drawn against Scottish club Hearts. In the first leg in Hungary, Paks took the lead in the 32nd minute with a stunning lobbed goal by István Sipeki. In stoppage time at the end of the first half, Finnish referee Mattias Gestranius awarded Hearts a soft penalty, which was scored by Jamie Hamill to equalise and end the scoring on the night at the Sóstói Stadion.

Ferencváros
In the summer of 2012 Dániel Böde was approached by the Hungarian giant club Ferencvárosi TC and he was offered a three-year contract. In his first season with his new club, he scored 17 goals in 30 matches, and was the second top goalscorer, after Adamo Coulibaly.

On 2 April 2016, Böde became Hungarian League champion with Ferencváros after losing to Debreceni VSC 2–1 at the Nagyerdei Stadion in the 2015–16 Nemzeti Bajnokság I season.

In the 2018-19 season, Ferencváros appointed manager, Serhii Rebrov. Böde and Rebrov had a very unsteady relationship throughout the year, as Rebrov saw many other strikers as the target man for the club. In an interview with M4 Sport, Böde admitted discomfort as he said, “The club wants to sign a new foreign striker every year, but at the end, I always play.” Ferencváros ended up becoming the Hungarian Champions that season. During an interview at the Ferencváros Celebration Parade, when he was asked about his future with the club, he said, “I really have not enjoyed coming to training after crying because of my lack of action. My heart is telling me to stay, but my brain is telling me to leave.” This quote saw many as Böde saying he is ready to leave the club in search of playing time.

Paks
In the summer of 2019, Ferencváros announced that their striker, Böde Daniel was leaving the club after 7 years at the club. M4 Sport reported that Böde had made the move to his former club, Paks, due to a lack of playing time at Ferencváros. 

In early September, 2022 Bode and Paksi FC mutually agreed to end his contract after the lack of playing time he received under the team's new manager Robert Waltner.

International career
Böde debuted for the Hungary national team in a friendly match against Belarus. He scored his first goal in 1–1 draw match against Turkey in the 2014 FIFA World Cup qualification. On 10 September 2013, Böde scored his second goal wearing the national team's shirt in a 5–1 victory over Estonia in the 2014 FIFA World Cup qualification match at the Puskás Ferenc Stadium.

On 8 October 2015, against Faroe Islands, Böde came off the bench at half-time when Hungary was 1–0 down. He scored twice in the 63rd and 71st minutes of the game, securing an important 2–1 win for Hungary in the UEFA Euro 2016 qualifying campaign.

On 15 November 2015, during the Euro 2016 play-offs against Norway, Böde became notorious when in the 81. minute, he tackled defender Even Hovland with what the press later called a "judo throw". He would later explain that he was trying to stop the opposing team from countering, and expressed surprise for receiving a yellow card. Minutes later his header would deflect off defender Markus Henriksen and into the net, putting Hungary 3–0 ahead in aggregate and securing the qualification.

He was selected for Hungary's Euro 2016 squad.

On 18 June 2016, he played in a 1–1 draw against Iceland at the Stade Vélodrome, Marseille.

Career statistics

Club

International

Scores and results list Hungary's goal tally first, score column indicates score after each Böde goal.

Honours
Paks
Nemzeti Bajnokság II: 2005–06
Magyar Ligakupa: 2010–11

Ferencváros
OTP Bank Liga: 2015–16, 2018–19
Magyar Kupa: 2014–15, 2015–16, 2016–17
Magyar Ligakupa: 2012–13, 2014–15
Magyar Szuperkupa: 2015, 2016

Individual
Nemzeti Sport Team of the Season: 2010–11
MVM Paks Player of the Season: 2009–10, 2010–11
Tolna megye Footballer of the Year: 2010, 2011
OTP Bank Liga top goalscorer (Deák Ferenc Award): 2015–16 - with 17 goals
MLSZ Player of the Season: 2012–13
HLSZ Player of the Season (Albert Flórián Award): 2012–13 2015–16 (shared with Zoltán Gera)
HLSZ Team of the Season: 2014–15 2015–16
nb1.hu Player of the Year: 2013, 2015
Nemzeti Sport Team of the Season (6): 2012–13 Autumn Season, 2012–13 2013–14, 2014–15, 2015–16 Autumn Season, 2015–16
rangado.hu Goal of the Season: 2015–16 - against Újpest FC

References

External links
Paksi FC Official Website
HLSZ

1986 births
Living people
People from Szekszárd
Hungarian footballers
Hungary international footballers
Association football midfielders
Paksi FC players
Ferencvárosi TC footballers
Nemzeti Bajnokság I players
UEFA Euro 2016 players
Sportspeople from Tolna County